Darion Ray Atkins (born September 17, 1992) is an American professional basketball player for Dolomiti Energia Trento of the Italian Lega Basket Serie A (LBA). He played college basketball for the University of Virginia before playing professionally in Israel, France and Germany.

Early life and college career

Atkins attended the Landon School in Bethesda, Maryland, where he averaged 15.2 points, 12 rebounds and 7.3 blocks per game as a senior, earning All-Interstate Athletic Conference honors.

Atkins had offers from Notre Dame and Maryland, but he chose to attend the University of Virginia, where he averaged 7.6 points, 5.9 rebounds and 1.1 blocks in 23.9 minutes per game in his senior year.

On March 8, 2015, Atkins was named ACC Defensive Player of the Year. On April 3, 2015, Atkins was named Lefty Driesell Defensive Player of the Year Award.

Professional career

Westchester Knicks (2015–2016)
After going undrafted in the 2015 NBA draft, Atkins joined the San Antonio Spurs for the 2015 NBA Summer League. On September 10, 2015, Atkins signed with the New York Knicks. However, he was later waived by the New York on October 23 after appearing in three preseason games. On November 2, he was acquired by the Westchester Knicks of the NBA Development League as an affiliate player of New York.

Hapoel Holon (2016–2017)
On July 1, 2016, Atkins joined the Golden State Warriors for the 2016 NBA Summer League.

On August 5, 2016, Atkins signed a one-year deal with the Israeli team Hapoel Holon. On October 22, 2016, Atkins recorded a career-high 26 points, shooting 11-of-16 from the field, along with 13 rebounds in a 72–81 loss to Maccabi Tel Aviv. On November 3, 2016, Atkins was named Israeli League Player of the Month for games played in October. On April 18, 2017, Atkins participated in the 2017 Israeli League All-Star Game.

Atkins helped Holon reach the 2017 Israeli League Playoffs as the first seed, but they eventually were eliminated by Maccabi Haifa in the Quarterfinals. On June 9, 2017, Atkins earned a spot in the 2017 All-Israeli League Second Team.

SIG Strasbourg (2017–2018)
On July 3, 2017, Atkins joined the Phoenix Suns for the 2017 NBA Summer League.

On July 21, 2017, Atkins signed with the French team SIG Strasbourg for the 2017–18 season. On December 5, 2017, Atkins recorded a season-high 23 points, shooting 10-of-12 from the field, along with four rebounds in an 87–72 win over Banvit. He was subsequently made the Champions League Team of the Week. Atkins went on to win the 2018 French Cup with Strasbourg.

Return to Hapoel Holon (2018–2019)
On July 28, 2018, Atkins returned to Hapoel Holon for a second stint, signing a one-year deal with an option for another one. On March 16, 2019, Atkins recorded a double-double of 25 points and 12 rebounds, shooting 10-of-13 from the field, along with two assists in a 101–82 win over Hapoel Jerusalem. He was subsequently named Israeli League Round 22 MVP. Atkins helped Holon reach the 2019 FIBA Europe Cup Semifinals, where they eventually were eliminated by Dinamo Sassari.

Iberostar Tenerife (2019)
On July 19, 2019, Atkins signed with Spanish club Iberostar Tenerife. On December 18, 2019, he parted ways with Tenerife after appearing in 17 games.

Brose Bamberg (2019–2020)
On December 19, 2019, Atkins signed with Brose Bamberg of the German Basketball Bundesliga for the rest of the season. He averaged 8.0 points, 3.6 rebounds and 1.4 blocks per game.

AEK (2020)
On September 22, 2020, Atkins signed with AEK Athens of the Greek Basket League and the Basketball Champions League.

Fethiye Belediyespor (2020–2021)
On October 15, 2020, he has signed with Lokman Hekim Fethiye Belediyespor of the Turkish BSL.

Niners Chemnitz (2021–2022)
On July 24, 2021, he has signed with Niners Chemnitz of the Basketball Bundesliga.

Aquila Basket Trento (2022–present)
On July 26, 2022, he has signed with Dolomiti Energia Trento of the Italian Lega Basket Serie A (LBA).

Personal life
The son of Minnette Atkins, he has a twin brother, Darius (a professional dancer in New York City) and majored in Sociology. Atkins claims soccer as his favorite sport other than basketball, and cites FC Barcelona as his favorite soccer team.

Career statistics

College

|-
| style="text-align:left;"| 2011–12
| style="text-align:left;"| Virginia
| 27 || 0 || 10.2 || .581 || .000 || .579 || 2.3 || .1 || .4 || .7 || 2.3
|-
| style="text-align:left;"| 2012–13
| style="text-align:left;"| Virginia
| 26 || 12 || 15.7 || .491 || .000 || .600 || 3.1 || .3 || .4 || 1.1 || 4.7
|-
| style="text-align:left;"| 2013–14
| style="text-align:left;"| Virginia
| 37 || 3 || 10.4 || .484 || .000 || .583 || 2.2 || .3 || .2 || .5 || 3.0
|-
| style="text-align:left;"| 2014–15
| style="text-align:left;"| Virginia
| 33 || 27 || 23.9 || .511 || .000 || .520 || 6.0 || .7 || .8 || 1.1 || 7.6
|-class="sortbottom"
| colspan=2 style="text-align:center;"| Career
| 123 || 42 || 15.1 || .508 || .000 || .562 || 3.4 || .4 || .5 || .8 || 4.4

Domestic Leagues

|-
| style="text-align:center;" rowspan=1| 2015–16
| style="text-align:left;" rowspan=1| Westchester Knicks
| style="text-align:center;" rowspan=1| NBDL
| 50 || 29.4 || .462 || .167 || .562 || 7.3 || 1.7 || .9 || 1.3 || 8.7
|-
| style="text-align:center;" rowspan=1| 2016–17
| style="text-align:left;" rowspan=1| Hapoel Holon
| style="text-align:center;" rowspan=1| IPL
| 37 || 27.2 || .590 || .375 || .616 || 8.2 || .6 || .7 || .7 || 13.6
|-
| style="text-align:center;" rowspan=1| 2017–18
| style="text-align:left;" rowspan=1| SIG Strasbourg
| style="text-align:center;" rowspan=1| Pro A
| 41 || 21.2 || .497 || .260 || .697 || 4.7 || 1.2 || .6 || .6 || 8.8
|-
| style="text-align:center;" rowspan=1| 2018–19
| style="text-align:left;" rowspan=1| Hapoel Holon
| style="text-align:center;" rowspan=1| IPL
| 37 || 24.3 || .596 || .394 || .737 || 7.2 || 1.0 || .7 || 1.0 || 12.4
|-
| style="text-align:center;" rowspan=1| 2019
| style="text-align:left;" rowspan=1| Canarias
| style="text-align:center;" rowspan=1| ACB
| 10 || 13.5 || .209 || .125 || .500 || 2.5 || .5 || .0 || .1 || 2.4
|-
|}

Source: RealGM

References

External links
Virginia Cavaliers bio 
RealGM profile

1992 births
Living people
American expatriate basketball people in France
American expatriate basketball people in Germany
American expatriate basketball people in Israel
American expatriate basketball people in Spain
American men's basketball players
Aquila Basket Trento players
Basketball players from Maryland
Brose Bamberg players
CB Canarias players
Centers (basketball)
Fethiye Belediyespor players
Hapoel Holon players
Liga ACB players
NINERS Chemnitz players
People from Clinton, Maryland
Power forwards (basketball)
SIG Basket players
Sportspeople from the Washington metropolitan area
Virginia Cavaliers men's basketball players
Westchester Knicks players